Stéphane Kreienbühl, known as Stéphane Belzère, is a Franco-Swiss painter. He lives and works between Paris and Basel.

Biography 

Kreienbühl was born in 1963 in Argenteuil (France). Son of the painters Jürg Kreienbühl and Suzanne Lopata, he spent the first five years of his life in Switzerland where he was raised by his paternal grandparents before returning to Cormeilles-en-Parisis to live with his parents.

During his studies at the Beaux-Arts de Paris, from which he graduated in 1990, he assisted his parents in various tasks, such as preparing their painting supports or organizing their exhibitions. Influenced by the realism of his father, he first painted there from nature the collection of antique plasters from the art school that were broken by students in 1968 and put away since then in the cellars.

From 1991 to 1994, he stayed regularly in Berlin where he depicted the urban landscape and the marks of recent history in the city after the fall of the wall: tunnels between East and West Berlin, dilapidated buildings, backyards…

In 1995, he returned to the National Museum of Natural History in Paris where he had accompanied his father a few years earlier. He paints directly in the "Soft Pieces" room of the Museum the brains and genital organs of animals preserved in formalin jars. He developed this theme of flesh in another series, the "Tableaux-saucisses" : "by painting from jars of food and organs that served as models, I sort of gave myself up to exploring the feeling of attraction/repulsion, the limits of the notions of beauty and ugliness. I thus amassed a collection of jars containing food, by making countless visits to food stores and supermarkets, while at the same time, I painted the jars of the so-called "soft pieces" collection gathered in the comparative anatomy section of the National Museum of Natural History. The visibility of flesh, whether for consumption or for scientific use, fascinated me".

 
His interest in transparency led him to the "Long paintings" series by observing the sediments in the bottom of anatomical preparation jars. Enhanced by the magnifying effect of glasses, these strata of disintegrated materials evoke glacial and interior landscapes, between figuration and abstraction.

From 1995 to 2013, in his studio in Berlin, he produced a series of small-format paintings, called "Nocturnal Reflections", that ended with the number 700 the day of his fiftieth birthday. Like a sort of diary, he painted his nocturnal full-length portrait, often naked, in the reflection of his studio window.

In 2003, he was chosen the winner of the competition launched by the Ministry of Culture (France) for designing the stained glass windows of the Rodez Cathedral. Completed in 2007 in collaboration with Ateliers Duchemin, his work is based on the idea of ​​the flow of light and life that penetrates all the chapels, introduces a dynamic and a fluidity that symbolize life and its perpetual renewal. He tried to renew the image of God and Saints in a more contemporary and understandable language, by adding more abstract elements in religious iconography, such as the reproduction of an Magnetic Resonance Imaging, the diagram of the nervous system or of the blood network to symbolize the divine thought and represent the immaterial.

At the same time, he also created installations, called "Chemical stained glass", by arranging on shelves some bottles of cleaning products whose transparencies and colors are highlighted by the play of lights.

Between the end of 2007 and the beginning of 2008, he had three simultaneous shows in public institutions at the Cantonal Museum of Zoology in Lausanne, the Musée Denys-Puech in Rodez and at the Chapelle Saint-Jacques in Saint-Gaudens. In 2013, the Art museum of Pully showed his "Long paintings" after he was awarded the FMES prize of the Sandoz Family Foundation in 2011. In 2021, the Strasbourg Museum of Modern and Contemporary Art (MAMCS) invited him to occupy a room in the museum for a year and a half; this exhibition entitled "Floating Worlds" is thought as a dialogue between his paintings, including an installation specially designed for the occasion and the collection of the Musée zoologique de la ville de Strasbourg.

Between figuration and abstraction, his work offers a reflection on the preservation of flesh, the representation of the body, the brain and the memory. Stéphane Belzère deals with his topics by focusing on the relationship between form and shape, on reflections, variations of light, transparency and color.

Exhibitions

Solo exhibitions (selection) 
 2021-2023: Mondes flottants, Strasbourg Museum of Modern and Contemporary Art
 2018: Szenographie einer Familie - Werke von Stéphane Belzère, Psychiatrie Museum, Bern
 2015: Pensées colorées, Hommage au peintre Jürg Kreienbühl, Galerie Franz Mäder, Basel
 2013: Nachtspiegelungen-Reflets nocturnes, Lage Egal Raum für aktuelle Kunst, Berlin	
 2013: Le projet des tableaux longs - Prix Fems, Musée de Pully, Lausanne
 2013: Œuvres sur papier, Centre d’art, Cesson-Sévigné
 2011: Vagues, tourbillon et autres turbulences, Galerie Nicolas Silin, Paris
 2010:	Überblick, Galerie Mäder, Basel
 2010:	Radboud University Medical Center, Nijmegen
 2009: Portraits de famille, etc…, Galerie RX, Paris
 2008: Reflets nocturnes, Centre d'art contemporain Chapelle Saint-Jacques, Saint-Gaudens
 2008: Peintures etc…, Musée Denys-Puech, Rodez
 2007: Peintures en bocal/bocal de peinture, Cantonal Museum of Zoology, Lausanne
 2006: Peintures d’après nature, Centre d’art, Épinal
 2005:	Vitrail chimique et peintures récentes, Galerie RX, Paris
 2003:	Conserves peintes - Eingemachtes, Café au lit, Paris
 2003:	Le Fruit de la rencontre - Histoires de bocal, Musée Raymond Lafage, Lisle-sur-Tarn
 1998:	Alles ist Wurst - Tout est saucisse, Association Fantom e.V., Berlin
 1997:	Tout est saucisse - Alles ist Wurst, Galerie Art & Patrimoine, Paris

Group exhibitions (selection) 
 2022:	De l’Onirique à la lumière, Château de Taurines
 2022:	Stéphane Belzère, Diaquarelles - Elisa Haberer, photographies, La nouvelle galerie, Cologne
 2022:	Memento Espace départemental d’art contemporain, Auch
 2020:	Pop-Up Artistes, Fondation Fernet-Branca, Saint-Louis
 2020:	Vitraux d’artistes, de Notre-Dame de Paris à l’abbaye royale de Fontevraud, Fontevraud Abbey
 2018:	Vitrail contemporain, Couvent de la Tourette, Évreux
 2018:	Jürg Kreienbühl, Suzanne Lopata, Stéphane Belzère, Kunsthaus Interlaken
 2015:	L'art dans tous ses états, Oeuvres de la collection du FRAC Ile-de-France, Les Réservoirs, Limay
 2015:	Le vitrail contemporain, Cité de l'Architecture et du Patrimoine, Paris
 2014:	Frisch gemalt, Museum Bruder Klaus, Sachseln
 2012:	Memento mori, carte blanche à Karim Gahdab, L’H du Siège - Centre d'art contemporain, Valenciennes
 2011:	Veilleurs de nuit, centre d’art de Tanlay, Château de Tanlay
 2011:	La lune en parachute, 20 ans, Centre d’art, Épinal
 2010:	CARNE, Le 104, Paris
 2010:	Artistes dans la ville, Musée d'art et d'histoire de Saint-Lô
 2009:	Open studios, Christoph Merian Stiftung, Basel
 2009:	Animalia, Musée Barrois, Bar-le-Duc
 2009:	Stéphane Belzère invite…Marc Desgrandchamps, Sylvie Fajfrowska, Régine Kolle, François Mendras, Anne Neukamp, Françoise Pétrovitch, Renaud Regnery, Philippe Segond, Xiao Fan, Galerie RX, Paris
 2009:	Eaux d’ici, Eaux de là, Chamalot-Résidence d’artistes
 2008:	On line, Centre d'art contemporain, Saint-Restitut
 2008:	Nourritures, corps et âme, Abbaye Saint-Germain/Centre d’art de l’Yonne, Auxerre
 2007:	L’Invitation au bocal, Frédérique Lucien-Stéphane Belzère, Galerie municipale Jean-Collet, Vitry 
 2007:	Artificialia 3, MABA - Maison d’Art Bernard Anthonioz, Nogent-sur-Marne
 2006:	A taille humaine, ArtSénat, Paris
 2006:	Quintessence, École supérieure des Beaux-Arts de Nîmes
 2005:	Artificialia 2, Musée Barrois, Bar-le-Duc
 2005:	L'inquiétante étrangeté des objets, Oeuvres du FRAC Ile-de-France, Musée Gatien-Bonnet, Lagny-sur-Marne
 2005:	Lumières contemporaines, Centre international du Vitrail, Chartres
 2004:	De leur Temps, MUba Eugène-Leroy, Tourcoing
 2002:	L’art d’être bête, l’animal dans l’art de Goya à nos jours, École d'Art Claude Monet, Aulnay-sous-Bois
 2001:	L'Autoportrait contemporain, Musée de 	Menton
 1996: Die Kraft der Bilder, Martin-Gropius-Bau, Berlin

Awards 
 2011: FEMS Prize, Sandoz Family Foundation, Pully
 1997: Paul Louis Weiler Prize, Institut de France
 1997:	Coprim Foundation Contemporary Art Prize
 1990: Aumale Prize, prix Alphonse Cellier Painting Prize, Institut de France
 1986: Fondation Princesse Grace Prize, Monaco

Commissions 
 2018: Realization of paintings for the maternity ward of Hôpital Mignot in Versailles
 2017: Realization of a new diorama after Louis Daguerre, Museum of Cormeilles-en-Parisis
 2016: Mural paintings for the technical high school Leon Blum in Villefranche-de-Lauragais
 2003-2007: Design and realization of stained-glass windows for the Rodez Cathedral
 1987: Realization of a diorama after Louis Daguerre for the bicentenary of his birth, Cormeilles-en-Parisis

Collections 
 Kunstmuseum Basel
 FRAC Île-de-France 
 Strasbourg Museum of Modern and Contemporary Art
 Musée de Boulogne-Billancourt 
 Fondation d'art contemporain Daniel et Florence Guerlain
 Fondation Colas
 Sandoz Family Foundation
 Christoph Merian Stiftung
 Collection Weber Bank
 Kunstcollectie Radboud University Medical Center

Bibliography 
 Vitraux d’artistes, de Notre-Dame de Paris à l’abbaye royale de Fontevraud, 2020 
 Szenographie einer Familie-Werke von Stéphane Belzère Psychiatrie Museum Bern, 2018 
 Architecture et art sacré de 1945 à nos jours, Archibooks, 2015
 Le vitrail contemporain, Editions Cité de l’architecture et du patrimoine/Lineart, 2015
 Tableaux longs - prix Fems, texts by François Landolt, Delphine Rivier, Nicolas Raboud, Jacques-Michel Pittier and Stéphane Belzère, Éditions Fondation Edouard et Maurice Sandoz, 2013
 Tandem 17, Guy Reid- Stéphane, Belzère, Éditions Croix Baragnon, 2015
 The French Connection : Kunstcollectie UMC St Radboud in Museum Het Valkhof, 2012
 Caring for art, UMC ST Radboud, Nijmegen, 2011
 Les artistes dans la ville, Musée des Beaux-Arts, Saint-Lô, 2010
 La Cathédrale de Rodez, les vitraux de Stéphane Belzère, texts by Dominique Paillarse, Michel Tassier, Bellino Ghirard, Philippe Piguet and Gilles Rousvoal, Éditions du patrimoine/Itinérances, 2008
 Peintures etc…, texts by Jens Emil Sennewald, Roland Kaehr, Emmanuelle Ryser, Sophie Serra, Christine Blanchet-Vaque, Eric Darragon, Karim Ghaddab, Valérie Mazouin, Éditions du Rouergue, Rodez
 A taille humaine, artsénat 2006
 Lumières contemporaines, vitraux du XXIème siècle et architecture sacrée, Centre international du vitrail, Éditions Gaud, Chartes
 De leur Temps-Collections privées Françaises, Musée des Beaux-Arts de Tourcoing/ADIAF
 Histoires de bocal, entretiens avec Eric Darragon, Le Rouergue/Actes, Rodez/Arles, 2003

External links
 Galerie Jean-Marie Oger
 Stained glass windows for the Rodez Cathedral on Ateliers Duchemin’s website

References

1963 births
French male painters
Swiss male painters
20th-century French painters
20th-century Swiss painters
20th-century Swiss male artists
21st-century French painters
21st-century French male artists
21st-century Swiss painters
21st-century Swiss male artists
Painters from Paris
Swiss contemporary artists
École des Beaux-Arts alumni
Living people